The Šumadija and Western Serbia is one of the five statistical regions of Serbia. It is also a level-2 statistical region according to the Nomenclature of Territorial Units for Statistics (NUTS). It was formed in 2010. As of 2022 census, the regions has a total of 1,893,659 inhabitants.

Formation 
In July 2009, the Serbian parliament adopted a new law in which Serbia was divided into seven statistical regions. According to the law, territory of present-day Šumadija and Western Serbia was divided into two statistical regions – Western Region and Central Region.

However, in May 2010, the law was modified and Western and Central region were merged into a single statistical region whose name is Šumadija and Western Serbia.

Districts 
The statistical region of Šumadija and Western Serbia is composed of 8 administrative districts:

Cities and towns 
The largest cities and towns of the region are:

References

External links 

 Usvojene izmene i dopune Zakona o regionalnom-razvoju (in Serbian)

 
Statistical regions of Serbia